Yaroslavsky is a rural locality (a selo) and the administrative center of Yaroslavsky Rural Okrug of Lensky District in the Sakha Republic, Russia, located  from Lensk, the administrative center of the district. Its population as of the 2002 Census was 457.

References

Notes

Sources
Official website of the Sakha Republic. Registry of the Administrative-Territorial Divisions of the Sakha Republic. Lensky District. 

Rural localities in Lensky District, Sakha Republic